Pentanone may refer to the following ketones containing five carbon atoms:

 2-Pentanone (Methyl propyl ketone, MPK)
 3-Methyl-2-butanone (Methyl isopropyl ketone, MIPK)
 3-Pentanone (Diethyl ketone, DEK)

See also
 Cyclopentanone